The California night snake (Hypsiglena ochrorhynchus nuchalata) is a subspecies of small colubrid snake native to California.

Description
The California night snake grows to a total length of 12 to 26 inches (30 to 66 cm), with hatchlings about 7 inches in total length.

The snake has a narrow flat head, smooth dorsal scales in 19 rows, and eyes with vertically elliptical pupils. They are rear-fanged and considered to be venomous, but not dangerous to humans.

Its color may be light gray, light brown, tan, or cream, often matching the substrate of the region, with dark brown or dark grey blotches down the back and sides. The underside is whitish or yellowish and unmarked, and they usually have a pair of large dark markings on the neck, and a dark bar through or behind the eyes.

Behavior
As their common name implies, they are a primarily nocturnal snake.

Diet
Their diet consists of primarily lizards, but they will also eat smaller snakes, and occasionally the soft bodied insect.

Habitat
They prefer semiarid habitats with rocky soils.

Reproduction
They are an oviparous subspecies that breeds from April to September.

Geographic range
The Coast night snake ranges throughout western California, ringing the central valley, but is not found in the valley itself. It is one of two night snake species in the state. The other is the desert night snake, Hypsiglena chlorophaea.

References

Further reading
Tanner, W.W. 1943. Two new species of Hypsiglena from western North America. Great Basin Naturalist 4 (1 & 2): 49–54. (Hypsiglena nuchalatus sp. nov., pp. 49–53.)

External links

California Herps treatment: Hypsiglena torquata

Hypsiglena
Endemic fauna of California
Reptiles of the United States
Fauna of the California chaparral and woodlands
Fauna of the Sierra Nevada (United States)
Reptiles described in 1943
Taxa named by Wilmer W. Tanner
Fauna without expected TNC conservation status